Danesi is a surname. Notable people with the surname include:

 Anna Danesi, Italian female volleyball player
 Bryan Danesi,  Chilean footballer
 Fabien Danesi, French art historian, lecturer in theory and practice of photography
 Marcel Danesi, current Professor of Semiotics and Linguistic Anthropology at the University of Toronto
 Tess Danesi, American sex educator, blogger, and writer of BDSM erotica